The Ponghwa Clinic and Hospital(봉화진료소) is a hospital located in Sinwŏn-dong, Potonggang-guyok, Pyongyang, North Korea, and is believed to be one of the top hospitals in North Korea, treating members of the political elite. It is administered by the Ministry of Public Health.

History
Construction on the clinic began in 1968, on orders from Kim Il-sung. The Clinic opened in 1971. The clinic underwent a series of expansions in 2003-2005 and 2009–2010.

Patients
Access to Ponghwa is restricted to members of North Korea's political elite, and the existence of the hospital is secret within North Korea.

Facilities
The Clinic has a helipad.

It is reportedly one of the few hospitals in North Korea capable of performing complex surgeries.

The ruling Kim family reportedly have a private wing for their healthcare requirements.

Weapons of mass destruction

The Clinic has been linked to the biological warfare program of North Korea.

See also

 Ponghwa Revolutionary Site – nearby historical site

Notes

References

1971 establishments in North Korea
Buildings and structures in Pyongyang
Hospitals in North Korea
Hospitals established in 1971